Commandant Dominé (U70/A15/F742) was a French Élan-class minesweeping sloop that served in World War II.

Ship history
Commandant Dominé was built by Ateliers et Chantiers Dubigeon in Nantes, laid down in February 1938, launched on 2 May 1939 and commissioned in April 1940. She was seized by the British on 3 July 1940 and transferred to the Free French Naval Forces, seeing service in the Battle of Dakar ("Operation Menace") in September 1940.

The ship was rearmed by the British in 1941. Her main armament was replaced by twin QF 4 inch Mk XVI naval guns, and she also received a single QF 2-pounder pom-pom AA gun to replace the quadruple 13.2 mm/76 AA guns. She retained her original twin 13.2 mm/76 AA guns, but had an additional four twin and two single 12.7 mm/62 machine guns installed.

Post-war she remained in service with the French Navy. In 1947 she was rearmed again, with a single German 105 mm/45 calibre SK C/32 gun as main armament, a single Bofors 40 mm/60 Mk.3 and four single 20 mm/70 Mk.2 Oerlikons.

Commandant Dominé was decommissioned on 18 August 1960, and scrapped in October 1960.

Notes

Bibliography
 

1939 ships
Ships built in France
World War II mine warfare vessels of France
World War II minesweepers of France
Cold War minesweepers of France
Elan-class minesweeping sloops
Ships built by Chantiers Dubigeon